The Cayos Arcas is a chain of three tiny sand cays and an accompanying reef system in the Gulf of Mexico,  from the mainland. They belong to the municipality of Campeche in the state of Campeche.

Bushes and several clumps of palms are also present. A pair of lighted range beacons stand on the cay.

The chain is uninhabited, and lacks structures except for the beacons on Cayo del Centro. Vegetation on the islands is sparse, consisting of sand shrubs and grasses. It currently serves as a navigational marker. Cayos Arcas Terminal, an extensive chain of petroleum stations on the Arcas' reef system is located to the south of the islands. The Arcas oil rigs are currently among the largest oil producers in the gulf in terms of output.

Geography

On the island, viewed through Google Maps, along with a covering of Palythoa caribaeorum, Zoanthus sociatus, Acropora palmata, Montastraea annularis, and Diploria strigosa, appear to be a few small buildings and small signs of past human habitation. The island has at least 6 sandy Tidal islands, none of which seem to exceed  or have any vegetation on them.

Cayo del Este is to the east of Cayo del Centro. To the west, the island has a fairly long spit of sand leading to a sort of tidal lagoon.

Cayo del Oeste, the smallest the main islands, is further from the other two, and is mainly a triangular islet connected to a spit of sand, with a very small amount of vegetation at the center. The island, although having no nearby islets/sandbars, does have a shallow strip of coast going southwest from its eastern edge. it also has a shipwreck on its eastern coast visible from google maps, It seems to have beached on its side, the ship's name is unknown, though it may be an oil tanker as there is oil industry nearby.

The island, although small, has a fairly large surrounding shallows, which nearby boats should be wary of. Some of the group, most notably a  cay on the North/Northeast part of the shoal, is surrounded by a very shallow, dangerous reef. The only safe entrances by boat to the islands are to the North-West-West, South-South-West, and West for the central, east, and west islands respectively. The islands are likely formed by coral growth around an extinct volcano caldera.

Maritime History of Campeche Bank
In the 19th century, the Arcas ocean bank was often used for military operations in the Gulf of Mexico. In 1843, a Texas naval flotilla from the Republic of Texas briefly occupied the island during the Caste War of Yucatán and Naval Battle of Campeche. During the American Civil War, the famous Confederate raider CSS Alabama used the remote chain as a rendezvous point to be resupplied while conducting operations in the gulf.

References

External links
 

Islands of Campeche
Natural history of Campeche
Uninhabited islands of Mexico